is a passenger railway station located in Isogo-ku, Yokohama, Kanagawa Prefecture, Japan, operated by the East Japan Railway Company (JR East).

Lines

Station layout 
The station consists of a single island platform with a two tracks and an elevated station building above the platform and tracks. The station is staffed. An adjacent side platform formerly used to support freight operations, was sold to the Nisshin OilliO Group.

Platforms

History
All freight operations were suspended from October 1986. The station was absorbed into the JR East network upon the privatization of the Japanese National Railways (JNR) in 1987. The station building was extensively remodelled in 2000 with the addition of ticket gates, automatic ticket machines, and new ticket windows.

Passenger statistics
In fiscal 2019, the station was used by an average of 20,199 passengers daily (boarding passengers only).

The passenger figures (boarding passengers only) for previous years are as shown below.

Surrounding area
 Isogo Ward General Government Building
 Isogo Ward Office
 Yokohama City Isogo Library
 Isogo Public Hall
 Koshinkai Shiomidai Hospital

See also
 List of railway stations in Japan

References

External links

 

Railway stations in Kanagawa Prefecture
Railway stations in Japan opened in 1964
Keihin-Tōhoku Line
Negishi Line
Railway stations in Yokohama